Balaji Mandir is a well-known Indian temple and landmark in Pashan, Pune. It was built by the Ahobila Mutt.

References

Hindu temples in Maharashtra